Linda Christanty (born 18 March 1970 in Bangka Island, at the island province of Bangka Belitung) is an Indonesian author and journalist.  She won the 2013 S.E.A Write Award. Some of her books are: Kuda Terbang Maria Pinto/Maria Pinto’s Flying Horse (short  stories, 2004), Dari Jawa Menuju Atjeh: Politik, Islam dan Gay/From Java to Atjeh: Politic, Islam and Gay (essays, 2008), Rahasia Selma/Selma’s Secret (short stories, 2010), Jangan Tulis Kami Teroris/Don’t Write that We Are Terrorists/Schreib ja nicht, dass wir Terroristen sind! (essays, 2011), Seekor Anjing Mati di Bala Murghab/A Dog Died in Bala Murghab (short stories, 2012), and Seekor Burung Kecil Biru di Naha: Konflik, Tragedi, Rekonsiliasi/A Little Blue Bird in Naha: Conflict, Tragedy, Reconciliation (2015).

Awards
 The Kompas Daily Best Short Story ("Daun-Daun Kering", 1989)
 Human Rights Award for Best Essay ("Militarism and Violence in East Timor", 1998).
 Khatulistiwa Literary Award (Kuda Terbang Maria Pinto, 2004 and Rahasia Selma, 2010)
 Indonesian Language Center Award of the Ministry of National Education (Dari Jawa Menuju Atjeh, 2010 and Seekor Anjing Mati di Bala Murghab, 2013)
 S.E.A Write Award (Southeast Asian Writers Award), 2013

References

External links
 http://www.japanusbusinessnews.com/2008/05/world-pen-forum.html
 https://www.nytimes.com/2008/03/14/arts/14iht-HKFEST.1.11075464.html?_r=0
 http://www.nationmultimedia.com/life/Love-death-and-ignorance-30218032.html
 http://www.bangkokpost.com/print/389275/
 http://criticalmuslim.com/issues/07-muslim-archipelago/me-islam-and-literature-linda-christanty
 http://dayan.org/content/current-contents-33-no-4-august-2013
 https://en.qantara.de/content/portrait-of-the-indonesian-author-linda-christanty-i-want-to-write-until-i-die
 http://www.literaturpflaster.com/linda-christanty.html

1970 births
Living people
Indonesian women writers
Indonesian journalists
Indonesian women journalists